Pedro II may refer to:

People
 Pedro II of Aragon (1178–1213), King of Aragon (as Pedro II) and Count of Barcelona (as Pere I) from 1196 to 1213
 Pedro II of Portugal (1648–1706), King of Portugal and the Algarves
 Pedro II of Brazil (1825–1891), second and last Emperor of Brazil
 Pedro II of Kongo, ruler of the Kingdom of Kongo during the kingdom's first conflict with the Portuguese colony of Angola

Places
Pedro II, Piauí, a municipality in the state of Piauí, Brazil
 Pedro II (São Paulo Metro), a station on Line 3 (Red) of the São Paulo Metro

See also
Peter II (disambiguation)